Daphnis et Chloé is the name of two classical compositions based on the story of Daphnis and Chloe:

 Daphnis et Chloé: ballet with music by Maurice Ravel 
 Daphnis et Chloé (Offenbach): operetta by Jacques Offenbach

See also Daphnis and Chloe (disambiguation)